Bris Funny Fest is a fringe comedy festival held for the first time in September 2016 in Brisbane, Australia. 

The festival was started by Kath Marvelley in 2016 as an alternative once the annual Brisbane Fringe Festival was not going to be playing in 2016. It is now the second largest comedy festival in Queensland with over 50 events as part of its 2017 program featuring much bigger acts such as Matt Okine. It encompasses genres such as stand-up comedy, Improvisational theatre, sketch comedy and musical theatre among others. It "showcases everything from established international artists to emerging performers putting on a show for the first time".

The festival is an open access "unjuried" festival (the model used by the Edinburgh Fringe Festival). There is no fee to be part of the festival, with the organisation being managed by a team of volunteers led in 2017 by Steven Morgan. In 2018 it was announced that Adam O'Sullivan was taking over as festival director.

Bris Funny Fest operates in venues all over Brisbane, though the majority of events take place at Heya Bar in Fortitude Valley, Queensland. Performers are free to approach any venue to host their event, with guidance offered to both performers and the venue by the organisers.

Previous Brisbane Fringe Festival 
The Brisbane Fringe Festival ran from 2012 to 2015, co-directed by Kylie Southwell with comedy curation by Scott Black who now works as an advisor on Bris Funny Fest.

References

External links 
 

Fringe festivals in Australia
Festivals in Brisbane
Tourist attractions in Brisbane
Companies based in Brisbane
Recurring events established in 2016
2016 establishments in Australia